Stony Creek is a  long 2nd order tributary to Mallard Creek in Mecklenburg County, North Carolina.

Variant names
According to the Geographic Names Information System, it has also been known historically as:
Stoney Creek

Course
Stony Creek rises about 0.5 miles north of Charlotte, North Carolina and then flows southeast through the northern suburbs of Charlotte to eventually join Mallard Creek.

Watershed
Stony Creek drains  of area, receives about 46.6 in/year of precipitation, has a wetness index of 419.66, and is about 31% forested.

References

Rivers of North Carolina
Rivers of Mecklenburg County, North Carolina